Five-eighth or Stand-off is one of the positions in a rugby league football team. Sometimes known as the pivot or second receiver, in a traditional attacking 'back-line' (No. 1-7) play, the five-eighth would receive the ball from the scrum half, who is the first receiver of the ball from the dummy-half or  following a tackle.

The role of the five-eighth is often to pass the ball away from the congested area around the tackle, further out along the 'back-line' to the outside backs, the centres and wingers, who have more space to run with it. Furthermore, players in this position typically assume responsibility for kicking the ball for field position in general play. The five-eighth is therefore considered one of the most important positions, often referred to as a 'play maker', assuming a decision-making role on the field.  Over time, however, as the game has evolved, the roles of the two halves have grown more aligned and difficult to distinguish.  Along with other key positions – fullback, hooker and scrum half – the five-eighth makes up what is known as a team's spine.

One book published in 1996 stated that in senior rugby league, the five-eighth and hooker handled the ball more often than any other positions.

The Rugby League International Federation's Laws of the Game state that the "Stand-off half or Five-eighth" is to be numbered 6. However, traditionally players' jersey numbers have varied, and in the modern Super League, each squad's players are assigned individual numbers regardless of position.

Etymology

Traditionally in rugby football, there have always been two half-backs as well as scrums involving the forwards. Of the two half backs, the name "scrum half" was given to the one which was involved in the scrum by feeding the ball into it and the name "stand-off half" was given to the one which stood off to the side of the scrum. In Britain, where rugby league originated, this terminology has been retained. In Australian English, however, "five-eighth" is the term used for the number 6, to differentiate from the "half back" which is the name commonly given to the number 7. In New Zealand, both terms appear to be used interchangeably.

Notable stand-offs
Five-eighths that feature in their respective nations' rugby league halls of fame are England's Roger Millward, Australia's  Wally Lewis, Bob Fulton, Brett Kenny, Albert Rosenfeld and Vic Hey, and New Zealand's George Menzies.

Rugby league's first known black player, Lucius Banks, played in the position for Hunslet R.L.F.C. in 1912-13.

See also
Rugby league positions
Rugby league gameplay

References

Rugby league positions
Rugby league terminology